The Rolling Stones' Tour of Europe '76 was a concert tour of Europe that took place in Spring 1976.

History

Tickets were in high demand; on 1 April the promoters announced that they had received more than one million applications in the mail for tickets for three shows at London's Earls Court Exhibition Centre; subsequently three more dates were added there. The routing also saw two dates in Yugoslavia – the Stones' second visit to a Communist country after 1967.

The tour began a few days after the 23 April release of the group's album Black and Blue, and is documented by the 1977 concert release Love You Live. Much of the material on that album is from the shows at Les Abattoirs in Paris from 4 to 7 June. Keith Richards' 10-week-old son died of sudden infant death syndrome on 6 June, but Richards elected to keep the news secret and to play the shows as scheduled.

Personnel

The Rolling Stones
Mick Jagger – lead vocals, harmonica, keyboards
Keith Richards – guitar, vocals
Bill Wyman – bass
Charlie Watts – drums, percussion
Ronnie Wood – guitar, vocals

Additional musicians
Billy Preston – keyboards, vocals
Ollie Brown – percussion, drums
Ian Stewart – piano

Guest musicians
Leicester, England, Granby Hall, May 15, 1976:
Eric Clapton – guitar and lead vocals on "Key to the Highway", guitar on "Jumpin' Jack Flash", and "Street Fighting Man".

Typical tour set list
(Songs credited to Jagger/Richards unless otherwise noted)
 "Honky Tonk Women"
 "If You Can't Rock Me"/"Get off of My Cloud"
 "Hand of Fate"
 "Hey Negrita"
 "Ain't Too Proud to Beg" (Norman Whitfield, Eddie Holland)
 "Fool to Cry"
 "Hot Stuff"
 "Star Star"
 "Angie" – [played some shows]
 "You Gotta Move" (Traditional)
 "You Can't Always Get What You Want"
 "Happy"
 "Tumbling Dice"
 "Nothing from Nothing" (sung by Billy Preston) (Billy Preston, Bruce Fisher)
 "Outa-Space" (led by Billy Preston) (Billy Preston, Joe Greene)
 "Midnight Rambler"
 "It's Only Rock 'n Roll (But I Like It)"
 "Brown Sugar"
 "Jumpin' Jack Flash"
 "Street Fighting Man"

"All Down the Line" was played at the Frankfurt Festhalle. "Sympathy for the Devil" was played at Earls Court Exhibition Centre on 21–23 & 27 May. "Cherry Oh Baby" was played in Paris on 7 June.

The Rolling Stones also appeared at Knebworth Fair in August 1976, where they added "(I Can't Get No) Satisfaction", "Around and Around", "Little Red Rooster", "Stray Cat Blues", "Let's Spend the Night Together", "Dead Flowers", "Route 66", a fragment of "Country Honk,"  "Wild Horses," and "Rip This Joint" to the above set list.

The Rolling Stones also appeared at two club dates in 1977 at El Mocambo, Toronto, Canada. Like the Knebworth show these were not part of the 1976 tour.

Tour dates

References

 Carr, Roy.  The Rolling Stones: An Illustrated Record.  Harmony Books, 1976.  
 Clark, Nobby.  Starfucker: The Rolling Stones Live in London '76.  Oberon Books, 2008.   Nobby Clark (photographer)

External links
 'Rocks Off' 1976 tour setlists
 'Frayed' 1976 tour pages
 Knebworth Fair setlist

The Rolling Stones concert tours
1976 concert tours
1976 in Europe
Concert tours of Europe